The Freeman Street station is a local station on the IRT White Plains Road Line of the New York City Subway. Located at the intersection of Freeman Street and Southern Boulevard in the Bronx, it is served by the  train at all times, and the  train at all times except late nights and rush hours in the peak direction.

History

Early history 
The first contract for the construction of a subway in New York, Contract 1, was executed on February 21, 1900, between the Board of Rapid Transit Railroad Commissioners and the Rapid Transit Construction Company, organized by John B. McDonald and funded by August Belmont, for the construction of the subway and a 50-year operating lease from the opening of the line. Contract 1 called for the construction of a line from City Hall north to Kingsbridge and a branch under Lenox Avenue and to Bronx Park. The initial segment of the IRT White Plains Road Line opened on November 26, 1904 between 180th Street–Bronx Park and Jackson Avenue. Initially, trains on the line were served by elevated trains from the IRT Second Avenue Line and the IRT Third Avenue Line. Once the connection to the IRT Lenox Avenue Line opened on July 10, 1905, trains from the newly opened IRT subway ran via the line.

To address overcrowding, in 1909, the New York Public Service Commission proposed lengthening platforms at stations along the original IRT subway. As part of a modification to the IRT's construction contracts, made on January 18, 1910, the company was to lengthen station platforms to accommodate ten-car express and six-car local trains. In addition to $1.5 million (equivalent to $ million in ) spent on platform lengthening, $500,000 was spent on building additional entrances and exits. It was anticipated that these improvements would increase capacity by 25 percent. On January 23, 1911, ten-car express trains began running on the White Plains Road Line.

Station renovations 
In Fiscal Year 1915, an additional stairway was being added to the station.

The city government took over the IRT's operations on June 12, 1940. The New York State Transit Commission announced plans to extend the southbound platforms at seven stations on the line from Jackson Avenue to 177th Street to accommodate ten-car trains for $81,900 on August 8, 1934.

Up until 1946, a limited number of rush-hour northbound trains on the Second and Third Avenue Lines terminated at this station, relaying north of it to turn around for southbound service. The Bergen Avenue cutoff, which allowed Third Avenue trains to access the White Plains Road Line, was abandoned on November 5, 1946, as part of the gradual curtailment of elevated service on the IRT Third Avenue Line. On June 13, 1949, the platform extensions at this station, as well as those on White Plains Road Line stations between Jackson Avenue and 177th Street, opened. Previously, the stations could only platform six-car local trains.

The station was renovated in 2004. The interlocking north of the station and the tower controlling it were both removed in March 2004 when the line was re-signaled to B Division specifications.

Station layout

This elevated station has three tracks and two side platforms. The center express track is used by the 5 train during rush hours in the peak direction.

There is zigzag lateral bracing at intervals of every four panels.

The 2007 artwork at this station, The El, was designed by the artist Daniel Hauben and commissioned through the MTA Arts & Design program. It consists of four faceted-glass windbreaks and two niche windows, depicting the roadway and the elevated tracks above, which recede in the background. According to the artist, the artwork is designed to convey a "feeling of both great depth and the sprawling vastness of the city".

Exits
The station has heaters, as well as a wooden mezzanine, floor, and open old booth similar to the one at Simpson Street. Exits lead to all corners of Freeman Street and Southern Boulevard.

References

External links 

 

IRT White Plains Road Line stations
New York City Subway stations in the Bronx
Railway stations in the United States opened in 1904
1904 establishments in New York City